In the 2013–14 season, Sion competed in the Swiss Super League and the Swiss Cup. 
In the summer transfer window 2013, the Chairman promoted 7 U21 players to the 1st Team. To bring stability and experience in they bought Vincent Rüfli and Xavier Kouassi from Servette FC, Pa Modou Jagne replacing Arnaud Bühler, twenty-one-year-old Freddy Mveng, Demitris Christofi as a winger and Ismael Yartey on loan as well as Beg Ferati and Ovidiu Herea.

The 2013–14 season began rather poorly with Sion not scoring a goal until the 7th round and setting a new record in the Swiss Super League for the lowest scoring season start. Decastel played with a 4-2-3-1 system.

Squad

Out on loan

Transfers

Summer

In:

Out:

Sion season
FC Sion seasons